Adam Glynn Page (born 10 March 1992) is an ice sled hockey player and Paralympic gold medalist. He won the gold medal with Team USA while competing at the 2010, 2014, and 2018 Winter Paralympics.

Page is a resident of Lancaster, New York and graduated from St. Mary's High School and subsequently Medaille College.

References

External links 
 
 
 

1992 births
Living people
American sledge hockey players
Paralympic sledge hockey players of the United States
Paralympic gold medalists for the United States
Ice sledge hockey players at the 2010 Winter Paralympics
Ice sledge hockey players at the 2014 Winter Paralympics
Medalists at the 2010 Winter Paralympics
Medalists at the 2014 Winter Paralympics
People from Lancaster, New York
Medalists at the 2018 Winter Paralympics
Paralympic medalists in sledge hockey